René Laforgue (5 November 18946 March 1962) was a French psychiatrist and psychoanalyst.

Biography
Laforgue was born in Thann (then part of the German Empire) and died in Paris. He studied medicine in Berlin, and in 1919 wrote a thesis on "The Affects in Schizophrenia Patients from a Psychoanalytical Point of View".  As his interest in psychoanalysis developed, he underwent a training analysis and began a correspondence with Sigmund Freud.  In 1926, along with Marie Bonaparte and eight others, he founded the Paris Psychoanalytic Society, where he became one of the most prominent members.

His (unsuccessful) attempt to collaborate with the Nazis over the Aryanisation of the society in Paris during the Occupation in World War Two cast something of a shadow over his later career, and in the year of his death, 1962, he was removed from the roster of training analysts by the International Psychoanalytical Association. 

Laforgue is the author of several books on psychoanalysis, albeit more popularising than original; as well as of a variety of articles on subjects ranging from the eroticization of fear in gambling, through the development of the sense of reality, to such defense mechanisms as psychological repression and isolation.  Intellectually however he remained as much indebted to the French tradition of Pierre Janet and Henri Claude as to Freud; and the tensions implicit in his competing allegiances contributed to his debate with Freud over the French introduction of the term scotomization. Initially welcomed as a description of the blocking of unpleasant perceptions in hysteria by Freud, the latter swiftly turned against it, arguing that Laforgue himself maintained "that 'scotomization' is a term that arises from descriptions of dementia praecox, which does not arise from a carrying over of psychoanalytic concepts".

Despite their theoretical disagreement, the two men remained on friendly terms, Laforgue visiting the Freuds on occasion in the 1920s: he would in the 1950s write a memoir of them, which offers a rare glimpse of Martha Freud as "a practical woman, marvellously skillful in creating an atmosphere of peace and joie de vivre".

Bibliography
 Clinical Aspects of Psycho-Analysis. Hogarth Press, 1938
 The defeat of Baudelaire: A psycho-analytical study of the neurosis of Charles Baudelaire. Norwood Editions, 1978

Bibliography about him
 Alain de Mijolla, Freud et la France, 1885–1945, Presses Universitaires de France, 2010
 M.O. Poivet, René Laforgue. Sa place originale dans la naissance du mouvement psychanalytique français. (1978). dirigé par André Bourguignon (Université de Paris Val-de-Marne, Créteil).
 Martine Lilamand, René Laforgue, fondateur du mouvement psychanalytique français. Sa vie, son œuvre. (1980). dirigé par André Bourguignon (Université de Paris Val-de-Marne, Créteil).
 Annick Ohayon : Psychologie et psychanalyse en France. L'impossible rencontre 1919–1969, Ed. La Découverte, 2006,

See also

References

External links

1894 births
1962 deaths
People from Thann, Haut-Rhin
People from Alsace-Lorraine
French psychoanalysts
French psychiatrists